David Warfield (November 28, 1866 – June 27, 1951) was an American stage actor.

Life and career
Warfield was born David Wohlfeld in San Francisco, California, to German-Jewish parents, Louise and Sigmund Wohlfeld. His first connection with the theatre was as an usher. He made his first stage appearance in 1888 in The Ticket-of-Leave Man. Two years later he went to New York City, where he appeared at the Casino Theatre and at Weber and Field's Music Hall. In 1901, he was discovered and promoted by David Belasco who starred him in The Auctioneer, in which he played 1,400 times, including a revival that extended over several seasons.  He remained under the Belasco management.

Although he appeared in many productions, his fortune and success in theater centered on his playing four major roles over a 25-year period: Simon Levi in The Auctioneer (1901), Anton von Barwig in The Music Master (1904), Wes Bigelow in A Grand Army Man (1907) and the title role in The Return of Peter Grimm (1911).

One of his best-known roles was that of Anton von Barwig in The Music Master, which he played from 1904 to 1908, appearing in the part more than 1000 times. In 1908, Warfield and his company appeared at the Elitch Theatre in The Music Master and A Grand Army Man.  Warfield's company included Denver-native and eponym of the Tony Awards, Antoinette Perry.

In 1911 Warfield created the title role in The Return of Peter Grimm.

Warfield's position as a leading American actor in comedy was established by the masterly style in which he portrayed, in each of these plays, a kindly old gentleman who is pathetic in misfortune and amusingly eccentric.  In 1916 he appeared in Van der Decken, a play by Belasco, based on the legend of The Flying Dutchman.

The World Famous Warfield Theatre in San Francisco, California (Warfield's birthplace) is named in his honour.

Warfield, who at the time was one of the world's richest entertainers, died in New York City, at 84.

References

External links

 
 
 David Warfield papers, 1897-1946 and undated, held by the Billy Rose Theatre Division, New York Public Library for the Performing Arts
 Images of David Warfield, held by the Billy Rose Theatre Division, New York Public Library for the Performing Arts
 

1866 births
1951 deaths
American male stage actors
Burials at Ferncliff Cemetery
Male actors from New York City
Male actors from San Francisco
Vaudeville performers